Pereira is a Portuguese parish, located in the municipality of Barcelos. The population in 2011 was 1,318, in an area of 3.85 km².

References

Freguesias of Barcelos, Portugal